
Gmina Miłoradz is a rural gmina (administrative district) in Malbork County, Pomeranian Voivodeship, in northern Poland.

Villages
Gmina Miłoradz contains the villages and settlements of Bystrze, Cyganki, Gnojewo, Kłosowo, Kończewice, Mątowy Małe, Mątowy Wielkie, Miłoradz, Pogorzała Wieś, Rękowo, Stara Kościelnica and Stara Wisła.

Neighbouring gminas
Gmina Miłoradz is bordered by the gminas of Lichnowy, Malbork, Pelplin, Subkowy, Sztum and Tczew.

References
Polish official population figures 2006

Miloradz
Malbork County